Per Bergerud (born 28 June 1956) is a Norwegian former ski jumper.

Career
At the 1982 FIS Nordic World Ski Championships in Oslo, he won a gold medal in the team large hill event. Bergerud reached the peak of his career at the 1985 FIS Nordic World Ski Championships in Seefeld, he won a gold medal in the individual large hill and a bronze medal in the individual normal hill.

Bergerud also won the ski jumping competition at the Holmenkollen ski festival in 1979. He earned the Holmenkollen medal in 1985 (shared with Anette Bøe and Gunde Svan). During his career, Bergerud won eight individual ski jumping national championships.

World Cup

Standings

Wins

References
 
 Holmenkollen medalists - click Holmenkollmedaljen for downloadable pdf file 
 Holmenkollen winners since 1892 - click Vinnere for downloadable pdf file 

1956 births
Living people
Holmenkollen medalists
Holmenkollen Ski Festival winners
Olympic ski jumpers of Norway
Ski jumpers at the 1976 Winter Olympics
Ski jumpers at the 1980 Winter Olympics
Ski jumpers at the 1984 Winter Olympics
FIS Nordic World Ski Championships medalists in ski jumping
People from Flesberg
Sportspeople from Viken (county)